In linguistics, an inflected preposition is a type of word that occurs in some languages, that corresponds to the combination of a preposition and a personal pronoun. For instance, the Welsh word  is an inflected form of the preposition i meaning "to/for him"; it would not be grammatically correct to say *.

Terminology and analysis
There are many different names for inflected prepositions, including conjugated preposition, pronominal preposition, prepositional pronoun, and suffixed pronoun. (But note that the term prepositional pronoun also has a different sense, for which see Prepositional pronoun.)

Historically, inflected prepositions can develop from the contraction of a preposition with a personal pronoun; however, they are commonly reanalysed as inflected words by native speakers and by traditional grammar.

Language change over time can obscure the similarity between the conjugated preposition and the preposition-pronoun combination.

Distribution

Insular Celtic
All Insular Celtic languages have inflected prepositions; these languages include Scottish Gaelic, Irish, Manx, Welsh, Cornish and Breton.

Scottish Gaelic
The following table shows the inflected forms of the preposition aig (at). These forms are a combination of preposition and pronoun, and are obligatory, that is the separate preposition plus pronoun *aig mi "at me" is ungrammatical. Also no separate pronoun may also be given after these combined forms. (So *agam mi is ungrammatical.)

{| class="wikitable"
|-
! colspan="2" |
! Singular
! Plural
|-
! colspan="2" | 1st Person
| 
| 
|-
! colspan="2" | 2nd Person
| 
| 
|-
! rowspan="2" | 3rd Person
! Masculine
| 
| rowspan="2" | 
|-
! Feminine
| 
|}

Welsh
The following table shows the colloquial inflected forms of the preposition i (to/for). The optional pronouns that follow the inflected forms are given in parentheses.

{| class="wikitable"
|-
! colspan="2" |
! Singular
! Plural
|-
! colspan="2" | 1st Person
| 
| 
|-
! colspan="2" | 2nd Person
| 
| 
|-
! rowspan="2" | 3rd Person
! Masculine
| 
| rowspan="2" | 
|-
! Feminine
| 
|}

The sentence Mae hi wedi ei roi iddo fo (she has given it to him) required the inflected form of i, mae hi wedi ei roi i fo is not grammatically correct.

The following table gives the inflected colloquial forms of the preposition o (of/from). The optional pronouns that follow the inflected forms are given in parentheses.

{| class="wikitable"
|-
! colspan="2" |
! Singular
! Plural
|-
! colspan="2" | 1st Person
| 
| 
|-
! colspan="2" | 2nd Person
| 
| 
|-
! rowspan="2" | 3rd Person
! Masculine
| 
| rowspan="2" | 
|-
! Feminine
| 
|}

Semitic
Inflected prepositions are found in many  Semitic languages, including Hebrew, Arabic, Assyrian Neo-Aramaic and Amharic.

Iranic languages
Some Iranic languages, including Persian, have developed inflected prepositions. For example, Persian az u ("from him/her") becomes azaš; bā šomā ("with you", pl.) becomes bāhātun. These forms are non-obligatory and are used especially in the colloquial register, though some of them are also possible in the standard language. As the two examples show, they are not mere contractions but a system of inflectional endings attached to the preposition.

Other languages
Languages that do not have full paradigms of inflected prepositions may nonetheless allow contraction of prepositions and pronouns to a more limited extent.

In formal registers of Polish, a handful of common prepositions allow amalgamated forms with third-person pronouns:  ("on him/it") → . However, these contracted forms are very archaic and rarely heard in daily speech.

For example, in Spanish and Asturian  means "with me".

Inflected postpositions

As languages can make use of postpositions rather than prepositions, so do some languages have inflected postpositions. Bororo, an indigenous language of Brazil, uses postpositions in all contexts: tori ji "about the mountains". When these modify a pronoun rather than a full noun, the phrase contracts into an inflected postposition (and therefore looks like a pronominal prefix, rather than a suffix as in the examples above): bagai "for", i-wagai "for me".

See also
 Breton language: Grammar
 Arabic grammar
 Hebrew grammar
 Irish morphology
 Portuguese personal pronouns
 Scottish Gaelic grammar
 Welsh morphology
 Hungarian noun phrases#Postpositions with personal suffixes

References

External links
 Examples of Irish prepositional pronouns
 Explanation of Scottish prepositional pronouns
 Prepositions with suffixes in Biblical Hebrew
 Prepositions with pronominal suffixes in Biblical Hebrew

Linguistic morphology